Parliamentary elections were held in Germany on 29 March 1936. They took the form of a single-question referendum, asking voters whether they approved of the military occupation of the Rhineland and a single party list for the new Reichstag composed exclusively of Nazis and nominally independent 'guests' of the party. Like previous votes in the Nazi era, it was rigged, with a claimed turnout of 99% and 98.8% voting in favour. In a publicity stunt, a number of voters were packed aboard the airships Graf Zeppelin and Hindenburg, which flew above the Rhineland as those aboard cast their ballots.

This was the first German election held after enactment of the 1935 Nuremberg Laws, which had removed citizenship rights (including the right to vote) from Jews and other ethnic minorities. In the previous elections and referendums under Nazi rule, Jews, Poles and other ethnic minorities had been allowed to vote without much interference, and even tacitly encouraged to vote against the Nazis (especially in districts that were known to have large populations of ethnic minorites). On 7 March 1936, Jews and Gypsies lost their right to vote. Their removal from the electoral process accounted for much of the large drop in invalid and negative votes, which fell from over five million in 1934 to barely half a million in 1936. The Nazis also lowered the voting age, in large part so as to ensure that the electorate was about the same size as in 1934 but also to exploit the relatively enthusiastic support of younger Germans for the Nazi regime.

The new Reichstag convened for formulary procedures on 30 January 1937 to re-elect its Presidium and Hermann Göring as President of the Reichstag.

Results

Notes

References

External links
Electoral propaganda posters from the Nazi era, including from the 1936 election and referendum

1936 elections in Germany
1936 referendums
Elections in Nazi Germany
1936
March 1936 events
One-party elections
Referendums in Germany
Single-candidate elections